Janez Kristof Pucher pl. Puechenthall  was a politician of the early 18th century in Slovenia, when the country was under the Holy Roman Empire. He became mayor of Ljubljana in 1710. He was succeeded by Anton Janeshitsh in 1712.

References

Mayors of places in the Holy Roman Empire
Mayors of Ljubljana
Year of birth missing
Year of death missing
18th-century Slovenian people